The Namyndykan is a river in Magadan Oblast, Russia.

The Namyndykan is a left tributary of the middle course of the Omolon, Kolyma basin.
The nearest village is Omolon, located to the east of its mouth. The basin of the river is a protected area.

Course
The source of the Namyndykan is in the northern end of the Kongin Range of the Kolyma Mountains, by the southern limit of the Yukaghir Highlands. The river heads across an uninhabited area and flows roughly eastwards until its mouth. Towards its middle course the river meanders strongly in a floodplain where there are swamps and lakes. Some of the lakes are quite large, such as the Krokhalin Lakes (Крохалиные озера) north of the river channel. In its last stretch the Namyndykan reaches the Omolon floodplain where it bends northeastwards before the confluence. 

The Namyndykan joins the left bank of the Omolon in the area where the great river makes a bend northwards.

See also
List of rivers of Russia

References

External links
Wetlands of Russia - Middle course of the Omolon River (in Russian)

Rivers of Magadan Oblast